"I Wanna Be Loved by You" is a song written by Herbert Stothart and Harry Ruby, with lyrics by Bert Kalmar, for the 1928 musical Good Boy.  It was first performed by Helen Kane on September 5, 1928, who was the inspiration behind the cartoon Betty Boop. "I Wanna Be Loved by You" was chosen as one of the Songs of the Century in a survey by the RIAA to which 200 people responded (out of 1300 asked). One of Marilyn Monroe's most famous musical performances is her singing the song in Billy Wilder's classic farce Some Like It Hot.

Background
The song was first performed in 1928 by Helen Kane, who became known as the 'Boop-Boop-a-Doop Girl' because of her baby-talk, scat-singing tag line to the song. This version was recorded when Kane's popularity started to reach its peak, and became her signature song. Two years later, a cartoon character named Betty Boop was modeled after Kane. Desirée Goyette performs the number as Betty Boop in the 1980s animated film The Romance of Betty Boop.

In 1950, the song was a highlight of the Kalmer-Ruby biopic Three Little Words, performed by Debbie Reynolds and Carleton Carpenter as Helen Kane and vaudeville performer Dan Healy.  Helen Kane dubbed the vocal for Reynolds’ voice.

In popular culture 
In Gentlemen Marry Brunettes (1955) about Jazz Age this song is performed by  Jane Russell, Jeanne Crain (dubbed by Anita Ellis) and Rudy Vallee.

In a Gilligan's Island episode, Ginger Grant sings the song on at least one occasion for the entertainment of the fellow castaways. Her performance so impresses Mary Ann Summers that she takes on Ginger's personality and identity after hitting her head. However, when Mary Ann tries to sing the song, her lack of talent makes her uncomfortable and she faints, snapping out of her amnesia.

In an episode of The Brady Bunch ("Never Too Old", October 5, 1973), Bobby (Mike Lookinland) must quarantine from the family after his first kiss with Millicent (Melissa Sue Anderson) could potentially  produce the mumps. Meanwhile, Mike (Robert Reed), in his den with Carol (Florence Henderson), pulls out his ukulele as Carol leads them in a duet of their own rendition. Alice (Ann B. Davis) pokes her head in, duster brandishing on cue with her closing "Boop-Boop-Be-Doop."

In Rob Zombie's 2003 film House of 1000 Corpses, Baby Firefly performs the song for the family's unwitting victims.

In the Australian musical adaptation of King Kong, the number is performed as Ann Darrow is robbed by thugs who taunt her.

The song also been recorded by performers Vaughn De Leath, Annette Hanshaw, Jack Lemmon, Frank Sinatra, Miss Miller and The Chipettes, Rose Murphy, Verka Serduchka, Patricia Kaas, Sinéad O'Connor, Jinx Titanic, Shiina Ringo, Claire Johnston, Eve's Plum and Barry Manilow (in a duet with the Marilyn Monroe recording) among others.

The song is performed in the 2007 television version of Kingdom of Crooked Mirrors.

References

External links

Song on Discogs

1928 songs
Songs with lyrics by Bert Kalmar
Songs with music by Harry Ruby
Marilyn Monroe songs
Songs from musicals